The Aigosages were a Celtic tribe dwelling on both sides of the Hellespont, first in Thrace and then in Troas and Mysia on the Asian side. 

Coming probably from the Kingdom of Tylis, they crossed over to Asia Minor where they were hired by the Hellenistic ruler Attalus I of Pergamum who intended to employ them as mercenaries in his war against the Seleucid prince Achaeus. After a lunar eclipse on September 1st 218 BC, however, the Celts refused to obey and Attalus, considering the risk of a revolt, led them back to the Hellespont, promising to give them land in the area between Lampsacus and Alexandria Troas. 
 
After the king's departure the Aigosages laid siege on the city of Ilium, but were thwarted by the Alexandrinian general Themistes. The Celts then turned against the territory of Abydos, taking the town of Arisba. Here they were finally defeated in battle by the Bithynian king Prusias I, who put them all to the sword, including the women and children.

References

Historical Celtic peoples
Ancient Galatia